The General Secretary of the STUC is the chief permanent officer of the Scottish Trades Union Congress, and a major figure in the trade union movement in the United Kingdom.

The Secretary is responsible for the effective operation of the STUC and for leading implementation of policies set by the annual Congress and the organisation's General Council. They also serve as the STUC's chief representative, both with the public and with other organisations.

The position was formed in 1922, when the Parliamentary Committee of the STUC became the General Council. The position of Secretary has been a permanent, full-time position in the TUC since that time. Before that, the Secretary was elected annually at Congress.

Secretaries of the Parliamentary Committee of the STUC
1897: Margaret Irwin
1900: George Carson
1918: Robert Allan

General Secretaries of the STUC
1922: William Elger
1947: Charles Murdoch
1949: George Middleton
1963: James Jack
1975: James Milne
1986: Campbell Christie
1998: Bill Speirs
2006: Grahame Smith
2020: Rozanne Foyer

Deputy General Secretaries of the STUC
1969: James Milne
1975: James Kirkwood
1978: John Henry
1988: Bill Speirs
1998: Grahame Smith and Ronnie McDonald
2006: Dave Moxham

Presidents of the STUC

References

Lists of office-holders in the United Kingdom